Nguélou is an arrondissement of Guinguinéo in Kaolack Region in Senegal.

References 

Arrondissements of Senegal